Louis-Hippolyte Lebas (31 March 1782 in Paris – 12 June 1867 in Paris) was a French architect working in a rational and severe Neoclassical style.

Life and career
He was trained in the atelier of Percier and Fontaine, the favoured architects of Napoleon. After Napoleon's exile he remained the assistant of Pierre François Léonard Fontaine, whose design for the sober Chapelle Expiatoire over the burial site of Louis XVI and Marie Antoinette he oversaw in construction (1816-1824). He also assisted Éloi Labarre (1764—1833) in completing the Palais Brongniart (1813-1826), the seat of the Paris Bourse, named after its architect, Alexandre Brongniart. 

One of his best known works is the Parisian church Notre-Dame-de-Lorette for which he was commissioned in 1823 and that completed in 1836. He built the former prison of Petite Roquette, (1826-1836, demolished 1974), which was the first example in France of a progressive panoptic prison. 

Lebas taught the History of Architecture at the École des Beaux-Arts, from 1840 to 1863. In this teaching role, applying the art-historical method of Johann Joachim Winckelmann to the study of historical architecture, he set a mark on several generations of young French architects.

His daughter married the historian and civil servant Léon Halévy.

Notes

References

 Barbara Boifava, Théorie, Pratique et Histoire de l'Architecture: L'enseignement de Louis-Hippolyte Lebas à l'Ecole des Beaux-Arts de Paris. 1842-1856, History of art thesis, Paris, Université Paris VIII, 2003.
 Françoise Largier, Louis-Hippolyte Lebas (1782-1867), architecte, historien de l’art, Mémoire de diplôme d'études supérieures de l'École du Louvre, 2004.
 Françoise Largier, "Louis-Hippolyte Lebas (1782-1867) et l'histoire de l'art", Livraisons d'histoire de l'architecture, 9.1, L'architecte historien, 2005.
Vassiliki Petridou, "La doctrine de l'Imitation dans l’architecture française dans la première moitie du XIXe siècle. Du Neo-classicisme au Romantisme `a travers l’œuvre de Louis Hippolyte Lebas (1782-1867)", Doctoral thesis Université de Paris-Sorbonne, Paris IV,  1992, vol II.
Vassiliki Petridou, "P.-F.-L. Fontaine et L.H.Lebas : une double paternité pour la Chapelle Expiatoire à la mémoire de Louis XVI et de Marie-Antoinette", in  Le Livre et l’art", études offertes en hommages à Pierre Lelièvre  par Thérèse Kleindienst, ed., Somogy éditions d’art, Paris, 2000

19th-century French architects
1782 births
1867 deaths
Architects from Paris
Members of the Académie des beaux-arts